Johan Pettersson (born 8 September 1989) is a Dutch-born Swedish footballer who plays as a midfielder. He is a free agent and his latest club was GAIS. He is son of the former Ajax and Swedish national team player Stefan Pettersson.

References

External links
 
  

1989 births
Living people
Association football midfielders
GAIS players
Swedish footballers
Skövde AIK players